Bucculatrix wittnebeni is a moth in the  family Bucculatricidae. It is found in Namibia. It was described in 2004 by Wolfram Mey.

References

Natural History Museum Lepidoptera generic names catalog

Bucculatricidae
Moths described in 2004
Moths of Africa